Women's race at the 2021 UCI Mountain Bike Marathon World Championships took place in Elba on 2 October 2021.

Course 
The 2021 XCM World Championship was held over a 35 km course with 2 laps plus an initial 2 km lap and a final 8 km lap. In total, the women's race was 80 km with 3,100 metres.

Result 
50 competitors from 20 nations started.

40 competitors reached the finish line.

References 

2021 UCI Mountain Bike Marathon World Championships